JLC may refer to:

 Jaeger-LeCoultre, a Swiss watch and clock manufacturer
 Jewish Labor Committee
 Jewish Leadership Council, British charity
 John Leggott College, a college in North Lincolnshire, England
 Journal of Language Relationship

People

 Joshua Lawrence Chamberlain, American Civil War general
 Jenna-Louise Coleman, an English actress
 John le Carré, pen name of British author David Cornwell
 Justin Lee Collins, a British comedian, radio and television presenter
 Jamie Lee Curtis, an American actress
 John Lloyd Cruz, Filipino actor
 Jason La Canfora, an American sports writer and television analyst